Alaska Public Media is a non-profit organization with member television and radio stations that are part of PBS, NPR and other public broadcasting networks.  Formerly known as Alaska Public Telecommunications, Inc., Alaska Public Media relies upon several funding sources, including member donations, state and federal dollars, and grants from private foundations, the Corporation for Public Broadcasting (CPB), and other organizations.

Alaska Public Media operates KAKM, a television station affiliated with PBS, along with public radio station KSKA (FM 91.1).  Alaska Public Media also operates the Alaska Public Radio Network (APRN), a network of more than 20 radio stations in Alaska that share news and other audio content statewide; as well as Alaska's omnibus television network, the Alaska Rural Communications Service, which is a joint venture of Alaska Public Media and Alaska's public broadcasters.

The stations claim 54,000 TV viewers nightly and 37,000 radio listeners weekly in the south-central Alaska region. Alaska Public Television is viewed statewide except in the Fairbanks area, which is served by KUAC-TV as a locally focused PBS station.

References

External links
 
 About AKPM
 People

Mass media in Alaska
 
American radio networks
Non-profit organizations based in Alaska